John Atwell may refer to:
 John Atwell (engineer) (1911–1999), Scottish engineer
 John Atwell (racing driver), American racing driver